William Anthony Foulkes ( or ; 5 January 1932 – 25 November 2013) was an English footballer who played for Manchester United in the Busby Babes teams of the 1950s, and also in the 1960s. His favoured position was centre-half. For Manchester United, he played 688 games which places him at number 4 on the all-time list of appearances behind Ryan Giggs, Bobby Charlton and Paul Scholes. He made 3 appearances as a substitute. He also started in every single United game in the 1957–58, 1959–60 and 1964–65 seasons. He scored a total of 9 goals in his 18 seasons at United and helped the club win four First Division titles, one FA Cup and one European Cup. He was capped only once for England in 1955.

After retiring as a player, he spent more than 20 years as a coach and manager at numerous clubs in England and overseas.

Early life
Foulkes was born in St. Helens, Lancashire, the first of three children born to James Foulkes (1900–1970) and his wife Ruth (1909–1961).

His grandfather had captained St. Helens rugby league team and was also an England rugby international. His father had also played rugby league for St Helens, and had also played football for New Brighton in the Third Division North. Foulkes himself played for the Whiston Boys Club in his teens, and also worked at the Lea Green Colliery as a miner, a job which he continued into the mid-1950s by which time he was a regular member of the Manchester United first team and had made his solitary appearance for the full England side.

He married Teresa Suffler (born 1936) at St Nicholas Church, Whiston, in spring of 1955. They have three children; Stephen (born 1958), Geoff (born 1962) and Amanda (born 1963). They have seven grandchildren named Lewis (born 1992), Matthew (born 1993) and Adam (born 1996), Jessica, Edward, Harvey and Philippa.

Manchester United

1950–1957
Foulkes was discovered by Manchester United while he was playing for the Whiston Boys club as an 18-year-old. He joined the club in March 1950 and played in junior ranks of the club before he turned professional in August 1951. He made his professional debut in the 1952–53 season in a First Division match against Liverpool on 13 December 1952 at the age of 20. United won the match 2–1. He also played 2 games for the England Under-23 team. During this time, he continued to work part-time at the coal mine, feeling he was not good enough to play full-time league football.

Foulkes scored his first of only nine goals for the club during the 1953–54 season against Newcastle United in a First Division match on 2 January 1954 at St James' Park. The goal was scored from near the halfway line, an achievement especially for a defender. United finished the season in fifth place.

Foulkes won his first cap for England 22 months after making his United debut, playing at right-back against Northern Ireland on 2 October 1954. However, that was his only international appearance at the senior level throughout his whole career. It was only after he won the cap that he stopped working at the colliery.

In the 1955–56 season, Foulkes won his first Championship with United. Towards the end of that season, Foulkes found himself laden with National Service commitments. Because of that, United manager Matt Busby began to favour Ian Greaves over Foulkes at right-back. Foulkes responded by training harder than usual, determined to be called back to play for the first-team. This attitude worked in his favour, and he returned to playing regularly for the first-team from the next season until the end of the 1960s.

United won the Championship in the 1955–56 season and thus became eligible to play in the European Cup in the following season, 1956–57. Despite objections from the Football League, United became England's first representatives in the European Cup. In the second match of the Cup, United demolished Anderlecht 10–0, although Foulkes did not score any goals. The result continues to be United's record victory in a European match. In that season, Foulkes helped United to the semi-finals of the European Cup, losing to Real Madrid 5–3 on aggregate after losing 1–3 at the Santiago Bernabéu Stadium and drawing 2–2 in the return leg at Old Trafford. United also reached the FA Cup Final, losing 2–1 to Aston Villa, and successfully defended their Championship title that season.

Munich air disaster
As winners of the Football League in 1956–57, United once again represented England in the European Cup in 1957–58. This was the season of the tragic Munich air disaster. In the second leg of the quarter finals against Red Star Belgrade in Yugoslavia, United drew 3–3, winning 5–4 on aggregate. After the match, the team had a reception, then travelled to the British Embassy where each player was given a bottle of gin.

On the return journey to Manchester on 6 February 1958, the British European Airways aircraft that the team was on stopped at Munich to refuel. Because of boost surging, takeoff was aborted twice. The pilot returned to the terminal, and after a while, it was announced that one more attempt to take off would be made. At that time, Foulkes had been running a card school with Kenny Morgans, David Pegg, Albert Scanlon, Roger Byrne and Liam Whelan in the middle of the plane. When he heard the announcement, he started to worry for his safety. In a 1998 interview with Carling-Net, he said of the announcement, "When they said that you didn't have to be a genius to know that this was going to be a bit dicey."

On the third attempt to take off, the pilots managed to control the surging, but as the plane reached the V1 speed, after which it is dangerous to abort takeoff, airspeed suddenly dropped. The plane left the runway and crashed into a fence and a house. In the 1998 interview, Foulkes recalled,

The plane had broken right under the seat that Foulkes was sitting on. In the crash, the bottle of gin from the British Embassy, which Foulkes had placed on the overhead rack with his overcoat, hit Foulkes on the back of his head. The head injury was the only injury which he sustained in the crash. Immediately after the crash, Foulkes climbed out of his safety belt and ran 50 yards away from the plane. He then turned back and saw the wrecked plane. As Foulkes later said,

The 23 survivors were admitted to hospital, but Foulkes was discharged and spent the night in a hotel with Gregg. The next morning, Foulkes visited his teammates in the hospital. He visited Duncan Edwards, Johnny Berry, Jackie Blanchflower, Viollet, Scanlon, Charlton and Ray Wood. Then, he recalls, "I was just beginning to think it didn't look too bad when I asked where the rest were. The nurse simply shook her head and said: 'That's it, everybody else has died.'"

It was only then that Foulkes realised the full horror of the tragedy. Seven of his teammates – Mark Jones, David Pegg, Roger Byrne, Geoff Bent, Eddie Colman, Liam Whelan and Tommy Taylor – had died at the scene of the crash, as had a further 14 people including three Manchester United officials.

Duncan Edwards died 15 days later as a result of his injuries. Club secretary Walter Crickmer and coaches Tom Curry and Bert Whalley were also killed instantly. Berry and Blanchflower survived but never played again due to the extent of their injuries. Foulkes himself survived, along with Busby, Charlton, Gregg, Morgans, Scanlon, Viollet and Wood.

Over the years since the disaster, Foulkes felt anger about the fact that the pilots had tried to take off a third time, despite the obvious dangers.

1958–1966
Immediately after the crash, Foulkes took over captaincy of the club in place of Byrne, who was killed in the crash. After matches against Sheffield Wednesday, West Bromwich Albion and Fulham, United reached the FA Cup Final, losing 2–0 to Bolton Wanderers. However, the team did not fare so well in the league, winning only 1 match against Sunderland, drawing 5 matches and losing 8, and finished in ninth place. In the semi-finals of the European Cup, United won 2–1 in the first leg against A.C. Milan, but lost 4–0 in the second leg at the San Siro, losing 5–2 on aggregate.

Manchester United finish runners-up in the league in the first post Munich season in 1958–59, but then finished seventh the 1959–60 and 1960–61 seasons before finishing 15th in 1961–62 - at the time this was the club's lowest postwar finish. In the FA Cup, the club exited the competition in the 3rd round, 5th round, 4th round and semi-finals respectively in the four post Munich seasons.

In the 1962–63 season, United did badly in the league, finishing in 19th place, but won the FA Cup after winning the final 3–1 against Leicester City on 25 May 1963. Throughout this time, Foulkes struggled a lot from the crash. He later said, "I lost so much weight, I couldn't eat, couldn't sleep, I was losing fitness and form and I'd really had enough."

On 10 October 1960, Busby played Foulkes at centre-half for the first time, having experimented with a string of players to fill the position after the crash had claimed the life of Mark Jones and ended the playing career of Jackie Blanchflower more than two years previously. Centre-half would prove to be his favoured position over the rest of his playing career, but he did not start to enjoy the game again until 1963. In the 1963–64 season, United finished second in the league, and finally won the Championship in the 1964–65 season, after a run of 13 wins in 15 games. By then, Foulkes and Charlton were the only two Munich survivors in the team. In 1966–67, Foulkes helped United win the Championship again, completing his haul of four Championship medals, more than any other United player of his era, and indeed any other player at the club for the next 32 years.

European Cup triumph
By winning the league title in 1966–67, United once again qualified for the European Cup for 1967–68. After beating Hibernians, Sarajevo and Górnik Zabrze, United faced up to Real Madrid in the semi-finals. Foulkes did not play at the first leg at Old Trafford, which United won by a narrow 1–0 victory. However, he did play the second leg at the Bernabéu on 15 May 1968, in which Real was leading 3–1 at half-time. David Sadler scored in the second half to level the scores 3–3 on aggregate. Near the end of the match, George Best sent a cross into the penalty area. Foulkes sidefooted the ball into the net, scoring one of the most important goals of his career and sending United into the final.

The final was held at Wembley Stadium on 29 May 1968. Up against Benfica, Foulkes started the match in central defence. As the match entered extra time, the scoreline was 1–1, with the United goal coming from Charlton. Then, Best, Brian Kidd and Charlton scored a goal each, and United triumphed 4–1, becoming the first English team to win the European Cup. 10 years after the Munich air disaster, Foulkes had finally won a European Cup winners medal at the age of 36. Foulkes later said that winning the Cup helped him to "get over the crash". He and Charlton were the only players left at the club from the time of the disaster. Indeed, all of the other survivors except Harry Gregg (who remained at Old Trafford until 1966) had left the club within four years of the disaster.

Last years
After winning the European Cup, Foulkes felt he had achieved all he could and wished to retire. However, Busby managed to convince him to stay for two more years, although he played less regularly during this time. The next season, United finished 11th in the league. In the 1968–69 season, Wilf McGuinness (who had played alongside Foulkes in the late 1950s) replaced the retiring Busby as manager of United. Foulkes played only three games under McGuinness, the last coming early during the 1969–70 season in a 1–4 loss against Southampton at Old Trafford on 16 August 1969. By this stage, he was the oldest player in the team at the age of 37, and indeed one of the oldest still active in the Football League. He officially retired from playing on 1 June 1970 at the age of 38.

By the end of his lengthy career, Foulkes had made 688 appearances for United, and scored nine goals. He had previously held the club's appearance record until Charlton (758 appearances) overtook him a while later and, later, Ryan Giggs and Paul Scholes, although he is still in fourth place for appearances for United. He had also made 3 appearances as a substitute in the 1968–69 season in the First Division. He also started in every single game United had played in the seasons 1957–58, 1959–60, 1963–64 and 1964–65. He served United in the First Division for 18 seasons, most of them as a regular player, and was the longest-serving player at the club at the time of his final game. He scored a total of nine goals for United, the first in a 2–1 league win at Newcastle United on 2 January 1954, and the last on 15 May 1968 in the victorious European Cup semi-final second leg tie in Madrid.

After retirement, he stayed at Old Trafford as a youth team coach from 1970 to 1975, when he finally left United after 25 years of unbroken service.

Post-Manchester United
After his coaching stint at United, Foulkes managed several teams. First, he was manager of English non-League club Witney United, which was then known as Witney Town. In 1975, he went to USA where he managed Chicago Sting (1975–77), Tulsa Roughnecks (1978–79) and San Jose Earthquakes (1980). He then travelled to Norway in 1980 to 1988 where he had two managing stints with Steinkjer FK, and also managed IL Bryn, Lillestrøm SK and Viking FK.

In 1988, he went to Japan and managed F.C. Mazda in Hiroshima until 1991. Then, he finished his involvement with the game and returned to England in 1992.

In October 1992, he auctioned mementoes of his career at Christie's as he needed the money. Twenty items were auctioned, raising almost £35,000. All his medals were auctioned, and his European Cup medal raised £11,000, while the jersey he wore in the European Cup final raised £1,800. Foulkes' European Cup medal was resold at an auction at Sotheby's in London in November 2012 as part of a collection of sporting memorabilia; this time, it sold for almost four times as much, going for £40,000.

Later life and death 
Even in his late sixties, Foulkes was still coaching for the Manchester FA, and was frequently requested to show Japanese visitors around the stadium, because of his four-year coaching spell in Japan during which he learnt the Japanese language. He was in attendance along with the four remaining players who survived the Munich tragedy on 21 May 2008, when United beat Chelsea on penalties in the final of the European Cup in Moscow, Russia.

In April 2011, he was portrayed by actor James Callàs Ball in the BBC TV drama United, the storyline of which was centred around the Munich air disaster. However, the character of Foulkes had little significance in the film and was not listed in the film's credits, despite his major role in the escape from the crashed plane. Foulkes himself did not take any part in the filming of the drama due to an undisclosed long-term medical condition.

Foulkes died at the age of 81 in Manchester on 25 November 2013. He had reportedly been suffering from Alzheimer's disease during the final few years of his life. His last appearance in public was almost four years earlier at the funeral of Albert Scanlon, another United player who survived the Munich crash. He is not believed to have attended the funeral of Kenny Morgans, another survivor of the crash, in November 2012.

Career statistics

†The League Cup began in 1960–61.

Honours

Club
Manchester United
First Division (4): 1955–56, 1956–57, 1964–65, 1966–67
FA Cup (1): 1962–63
European Cup (1): 1967–68
FA Charity Shield (3): 1956, 1957, 1967* (* joint winners)

References

External links

 Short biography on the official Manchester United website

1932 births
2013 deaths
Association football defenders
England international footballers
England under-23 international footballers
English expatriate sportspeople in Norway
English Football League players
English Football League representative players
English football managers
English footballers
Expatriate football managers in Norway
FA Cup Final players
Footballers from St Helens, Merseyside
Lillestrøm SK managers
Manchester United F.C. players
North American Soccer League (1968–1984) coaches
San Jose Earthquakes (1974–1988) coaches
Steinkjer FK managers
Survivors of aviation accidents or incidents
UEFA Champions League winning players
Viking FK managers